The three-colored blind snake (Epictia tricolor) is a species of snakes in the family Leptotyphlopidae.

References

Epictia
Reptiles described in 1974